Saint-Samson is a former commune in the Mayenne department in north-western France. On 1 January 2016, it was merged into the new commune of Pré-en-Pail-Saint-Samson. Its population was 418 in 2019.

See also 

 Communes of the Mayenne department
 Parc naturel régional Normandie-Maine

References 

Saintsamson